Redfield Canyon Wilderness is a protected wilderness area on the southern end of the Galiuro Mountains in the U.S. state of Arizona.  Established in 1990 under the Arizona Desert Wilderness Act the area is managed by the Bureau of Land Management and south of the Coronado National Forest managed Galiuro Wilderness. This area is primarily centered around its namesake canyon, a narrow chasm connected to many side canyons with perennial streams.

The wilderness ranges from 3,400 (1036 m) to 6,200 (1889 m)and is home to an abundance of wildlife including mule deer, pronghorn, desert bighorn sheep, coyotes, mountain lions, and American black bears.

See also
 List of Arizona Wilderness Areas
 List of U.S. Wilderness Areas

References

External links
 Muleshoe Ranch Cooperative Management Area – BLM
 Muleshoe Ranch CMA – The Nature Conservancy

IUCN Category Ib
Wilderness areas of Arizona
Protected areas of Graham County, Arizona
Protected areas of Cochise County, Arizona
Protected areas established in 1990
1990 establishments in Arizona